Malcolm McDowell (born Malcolm John Taylor; 13 June 1943) is a British actor, producer, and television presenter. He is best known for portraying Alex DeLarge in A Clockwork Orange. He was born in the Horsforth suburb of Leeds and raised in Liverpool. He later trained at the London Academy of Music and Dramatic Art before embarking on an acting career that has spanned over 50 years.

He is also known for playing the title character in Caligula (1979), and Mick Travis in the trilogy of if.... (1968), O Lucky Man! (1973), and Britannia Hospital (1982). He has also appeared in films such as Time After Time (1979), Cat People (1982), Blue Thunder  (1983), Star Trek Generations (1994), Tank Girl (1995), Gangster No. 1 (2000), Easy A (2010), The Artist (2011) and Bombshell (2019). He also appeared as Dr. Samuel Loomis in the 2007 remake Halloween and its 2009 sequel, Halloween II.

He has also had a string of roles on television series such as recurring roles on Entourage (2005–2011) and Heroes (2006–2007), and starring roles on Franklin & Bash (2011–2014) and Mozart in the Jungle (2014–2018). 

He is also a voice actor, having voiced Metallo on Superman: The Animated Series and Justice League Unlimited,  Vater Orlaag in Metalocalypse, Dr. Calico in Bolt, President Eden in Fallout 3 (2008), Molag Bal in The Elder Scrolls Online, and Dr. Monty in Call of Duty: Black Ops III (2015) He received a star on the Hollywood Walk of Fame in 2012.

Early life
McDowell was born Malcolm John Taylor on 13 June 1943 in Horsforth, West Riding of Yorkshire, the son of hotelier Edna (née McDowell) and RAF officer (and later pub owner) Charles Taylor. He has an older sister named Gloria and a younger sister named Judy. Gloria later had a son, actor Alexander Siddig, alongside whom McDowell would appear in the film Doomsday (2008). The family moved to Bridlington, East Riding of Yorkshire, where McDowell's father was stationed at the nearby RAF Carnaby. They then moved to Liverpool, where McDowell grew up and as a teenager took a job in a Planters nut factory in nearby Aintree, as well as working at his father's pub, The Bull and Dog, in Burscough, Lancashire. He began taking acting classes while in school, later moving to London in order to train as an actor at the London Academy of Music and Dramatic Art (LAMDA).

Career

Acting

McDowell initially secured work as an extra with the Royal Shakespeare Company. He made his film debut as school rebel Mick Travis in if.... (1968) by British director Lindsay Anderson. A landmark of British countercultural cinema, the BFI named if.... the 12th greatest British film of the 20th century. McDowell's next roles were in Figures in a Landscape (1970) and The Raging Moon (1971). His performance in if.... caught the attention of Stanley Kubrick, who cast McDowell for the lead in A Clockwork Orange (1971), adapted from the novel by Anthony Burgess. He gained massive acclaim for his performance as Alex DeLarge, a young sadist who undergoes brainwashing by the British government in a near future society. He was nominated for a Golden Globe, a National Society of Film Critics Award, and a New York Film Critics Circle Award as Best Actor.

He worked with Anderson again for O Lucky Man! (1973, also wrote), which was inspired by McDowell's experience working as a coffee salesman, and Britannia Hospital (1982). McDowell regularly appeared on British television productions in the 1970s in adaptations of theatre classics, one example being with Laurence Olivier in The Collection (1976), as part of the series Laurence Olivier Presents. He starred in Aces High (1976) and co-starred in Voyage of the Damned (1976), and as Dornford Yates' gentleman hero Richard Chandos in She Fell Among Thieves (1978) and the title character in Caligula (1979). He made his Hollywood debut as H. G. Wells in Time After Time (1979). He has often portrayed antagonists, later remarking on his career playing film villains: "I suppose I'm primarily known for that but in fact, that would only be half of my career if I was to top it all up". In his biography Anthony Burgess: A Life, author Roger Lewis commented on McDowell's later career: "his pretty-boy looks faded and he was condemned to playing villains in straight-to-video films that turn up on Channel 5".

McDowell appeared in the action film Blue Thunder (1983) as F.E. Cochrane, and the horror remake Cat People (1982). In 1983, he starred in Get Crazy as Reggie Wanker, a parody of Mick Jagger. Also in 1983, McDowell starred as the Wolf (Reginald von Lupen) in Faerie Tale Theatres rendition of "Little Red Riding Hood" (his wife at that time, Mary Steenburgen, played Little Red Riding Hood). In 1984, he narrated the documentary The Compleat Beatles. He is known in Star Trek circles as "the man who killed Captain Kirk", appearing in the film Star Trek Generations (1994) in which he played the mad scientist Dr. Tolian Soran, and several overzealous Star Trek fans even issued death threats for this. McDowell appeared in several computer games, most notably as Admiral Geoffrey Tolwyn in the Wing Commander series of computer games. His appearance in Wing Commander III marked the series transition from 2D pre-rendered cutscenes to live-action cutscenes. His appearance in Wing Commander IV was during the final days of video game live action cutscenes.

In 1995, he co-starred with actress and artist Lori Petty in the science fiction/action comedy film Tank Girl. Here, he played the villain Dr. Kesslee, the evil director of the global Water and Power Company, whose main goal in the story was to control the planet's entire water supply on a future desert-like, post-apocalyptic Earth.

McDowell appeared in a 2000 episode of the animated series South Park, which was a comedic retelling of the Charles Dickens novel Great Expectations. In the episode, McDowell played the real-life narrator of the story in live action, introducing himself simply as "a British person," in a parody of Masterpiece Theatre, and its ex-host, Alistair Cooke.

McDowell played himself in Robert Altman's The Player, in which he chastises protagonist Griffin Mill (Tim Robbins) for badmouthing him behind his back. He worked with Altman once again for The Company (2003) as "Mr. A.", the fictional director of the Joffrey Ballet of Chicago. His character was based on real-life director Gerald Arpino. McDowell had a brief but memorable role as the psychopathic Gangster in the British crime film Gangster No. 1 (2000). In the film I'll Sleep When I'm Dead (2003), he played a straight married man who rapes a young drug dealer to "teach him a lesson". The film also starred Clive Owen as the victim's elder brother.

In 2006, McDowell portrayed radio mogul Jonas Slaughter on Law & Order: Criminal Intent. The following year, he portrayed the villainous Mr. Linderman on the first season of the NBC series Heroes, a role he reprised in the third-season premiere. He starred in Jerry Was a Man, which appeared as an episode of Masters of Science Fiction on Sky. He portrayed Terrence McQuewick on Entourage, and he made a Special Guest Appearance as the icy fashion designer Julian Hodge in the Monk season 4 episode, "Mr. Monk Goes to a Fashion Show". Never Apologize is a 2007 documentary film of Malcolm McDowell's one-man show about his experiences working with film director Lindsay Anderson.

McDowell appeared as Dr. Samuel Loomis in Rob Zombie's remakes of Halloween and Halloween II (in 2007 and 2009, respectively). Although the films were not well received critically, they performed better at the box office and McDowell was widely praised for his performances and for being perfectly cast. He also played Desmond LaRochette in Robert Whitlow's The List (2007), and Irish patriarch Enda Doyle in Red Roses and Petrol (2003). His next film is the Canadian vampire comedy rock and roll film Suck (2009) with actor/director Rob Stefaniuk and the upcoming Alex Wright film Two Wolves. In December 2009, he made an appearance in the music video "Snuff" by the heavy metal band Slipknot. He appears, uncredited, as the curator Lombardi, in the film The Book of Eli (2010). McDowell portrayed Satan in the Christian comedy thriller film Suing the Devil (2011).

In 2011, McDowell was cast in the role of Stanton Infeld on the TNT original series Franklin & Bash, and appeared in the Academy Award-winning film The Artist. In 2012, McDowell appeared in the horror films Vamps and Silent Hill: Revelation. On 16 March 2012, he received a star on the Hollywood Walk of Fame, aptly outside the Pig n' Whistle British pub on Hollywood Boulevard. His fellow British actor Gary Oldman was in attendance and paid tribute to McDowell for inspiring him to become an actor.

In 2013, he appeared as the title character in the psychological thriller The Employer, for which he won Best Actor at the Los Angeles Movie Awards. In 2013, McDowell also ventured into the Steampunk genre, starring in the short film Cowboys & Engines alongside Richard Hatch and Walter Koenig. In 2013, he starred as King Henry II of England in the film Richard the Lionheart, with Gregory Chandler as the title character. He portrayed Father Murder in the 2016 Rob Zombie film 31. McDowell also played Boogeyman in Abnormal Attraction (2018) co-starring Gilbert Gottfried, Bruce Davison, Tyler Mane and Leslie Easterbrook.

Voice acting

McDowell was the featured narrator in the documentary The Compleat Beatles, released in 1982. He voiced Lord Maliss in Happily Ever After (1989), Zarm in the cartoon Captain Planet and the Planeteers, the Superman villain Metallo in Superman: The Animated Series, Mad Mod on Teen Titans, Merlyn in DC Showcase: Green Arrow (2010), Arkady Duvall (son of Ra's al Ghul) on Batman: The Animated Series and as the voice of a Death Star commander on a Robot Chicken episode parodying Star Wars. He is also a regular on the second season of the Adult Swim cartoon Metalocalypse as Vater Orlaag and other characters. McDowell also voiced Dr. Calico in Disney's Bolt (2008) and the henchman Reeses II in the animated series Captain Simian & the Space Monkeys, a show laced with references to many films, including his own role in A Clockwork Orange.

In 2006–07, he contributed spoken word to two Pink Floyd tribute albums produced by Billy Sherwood: Back Against the Wall and Return to the Dark Side of the Moon. He has also provided voice-over work for Borgore on his album #NEWGOREORDER (2014). In 2008, McDowell began a recurring role as Grandpa Fletcher on Phineas and Ferb. He also narrated the award-winning documentary Blue Gold: World Water Wars.

McDowell reprised his role of Metallo in the video game Superman: Shadow of Apokolips and an episode of Justice League Unlimited. He also provided his voice for the character President John Henry Eden in the video game Fallout 3, Rupert Pelham in the game WET, King Solomon in the Word of Promise Audio Bible, and the CEO of Stahl Arms in Killzone 3, Jorhan Stahl. He also voiced Daedalus in God of War III. He is the voice for the primary antagonist Molag Bal in the MMO The Elder Scrolls Online. He is also the voice of Dr. Monty in Call of Duty: Black Ops III.

McDowell portrayed Caiaphas in The Truth & Life Dramatised audio New Testament Bible, a 22-hour, celebrity-voiced, fully dramatised audio New Testament which uses the RSV-CE translation.

McDowell is the host of Fangoria's Dreadtime Stories, a monthly series of radio dramas with a mystery, horror, science fiction and dark humour theme. Each month, a new episode is available for download, and scripts, as used by McDowell and the supporting actors, are also available at the Fangoria website.

In 2020, he interpreted Gabriele Tinti's poetry inspired by epigraphs collected in the National Roman Museum.

Personal life
McDowell met actress and publicist Margot Bennett in March 1969, and they were married from April 1975 to September 1980. He met actress Mary Steenburgen in 1978 while filming Time After Time, and they married in September 1980. They had two children together, Lilly (born 22 January 1981) and filmmaker Charlie McDowell (born 10 July 1983), before divorcing in 1990. He married Kelley Kuhr, 24 years his junior, in 1991. They live in Ojai, California, and have three sons together: Beckett McDowell (born 18 January 2004), Finnian (born 23 December 2006), and Seamus (born 7 January 2009).

McDowell became a fan of Liverpool FC after moving to Liverpool as a child, spending much of his childhood at Anfield, and continues to support the team. On May 31, 2021, McDowell posted on Instagram that he became an American citizen.

Filmography

Film

Television

Video games

Music videos

Theatre

References

Interviews
 N.P. Thompson's interview with Malcolm McDowell for Slant/The House Next Door
 Interactive video talk by McDowell on the British "Free Cinema" movement of the '50s, made for the British Film Institute
 "What if..." – The Guardian, 24 April 2004. In-depth profile and interview.
 "O Lucky Man! Malcolm McDowell's journey from coffee salesman to movie star" – The Times, 17 May 2008
 "Audiobook read by Malcolm McDowell" – The Bobbything, 2010
 "COWBOYS & ENGINES"  – by Bryn Pryor

External links

 
 
 
 
 

1943 births
Living people
20th-century English male actors
21st-century English male actors
Alumni of the London Academy of Music and Dramatic Art
Audiobook narrators
British expatriate male actors in the United States
English expatriates in the United States
English male film actors
English male stage actors
English male television actors
English male video game actors
English male voice actors
Male actors from Leeds
People from Bridlington
People from Horsforth
Royal Shakespeare Company members